John E. Gumbleton (born 1967) is a United States Navy rear admiral.

Education 
Raised in Falmouth, Massachusetts, Gumbleton graduated from Falmouth High School in 1985. He then earned a B.S. degree in environmental engineering from Norwich University in 1989. Commissioned in May 1989, Gumbleton was designated a naval aviator in October 1990 after completing flight school. He later received an M.S. degree in information systems from George Washington University and an M.A. degree in national security and strategic studies from the Naval War College.

Career 
Gumbleton has served as the Deputy Assistant Secretary of the Navy for Budget and Director of Fiscal Management of the United States Navy since May 1, 2020. Previously, he served as the Commander of Expeditionary Strike Group 3 from 2019 until April 13, 2020.

References

External links

1967 births
Living people
Place of birth missing (living people)
People from Falmouth, Massachusetts
Norwich University alumni
United States Naval Aviators
George Washington University School of Engineering and Applied Science alumni
Naval War College alumni
Recipients of the Legion of Merit
United States Navy admirals
Falmouth High School (Massachusetts) alumni